Reedsmouth is a closed railway station in Northumberland, England. It was a junction station where the Wansbeck Railway (Morpeth to Reedsmouth) joined the Border Counties Railway (Hexham to Riccarton Junction). It served the village of Redesmouth, which is spelled differently.

The station was opened in November 1864. It was closed to passengers in October 1956, but remained open for goods trains and public excursions until November 11, 1963. Today, the station can be visited on foot by going into the hamlet of Redesmouth, through the kissing gate and following the footpath signs towards Countess Park. Furthermore, there are old photos and relics to be found at Bellingham Heritage Centre and at the Carriages Tea Room which, as the name suggests, is situated in a restored railway carriage in the Heritage Centre car park.

Services

See also 
 List of closed railway stations in Britain

References 

Disused railway stations in Northumberland
Railway stations in Great Britain opened in 1861
Railway stations in Great Britain closed in 1956
Former North British Railway stations
1861 establishments in England
Bellingham, Northumberland